Metandrocarpa is a genus of ascidian tunicates in the family Styelidae.

Species within the genus Metandrocarpa include:
 Metandrocarpa agitata Kott, 1985 
 Metandrocarpa asymmetra Monniot C., 2001 
 Metandrocarpa dura (Ritter, 1896) 
 Metandrocarpa fascicularis Millar, 1962 
 Metandrocarpa indica Kott, 1972 
 Metandrocarpa kudoi Rho & Cole, 1999 
 Metandrocarpa manina Monniot & Monniot, 1987 
 Metandrocarpa michaelseni Ritter & Forsyth, 1917 
 Metandrocarpa miniscula Kott, 1985 
 Metandrocarpa protostigmatica Michaelsen, 1922 
 Metandrocarpa reducta Monniot, 1988 
 Metandrocarpa sterreri Monniot, 1972 
 Metandrocarpa taylori Huntsman, 1912 
 Metandrocarpa thilenii Michaelsen, 1922 
 Metandrocarpa uedai Watanabe & Tokioka, 1972

Species names currently considered to be synonyms:
 Metandrocarpa dermatina Huntsman, 1912: synonym of Metandrocarpa dura (Ritter, 1896) 
 Metandrocarpa protostigmata Michaelsen, 1922: synonym of Metandrocarpa protostigmatica Michaelsen, 1922 
 Metandrocarpa tritonis (Michaelsen, 1904): synonym of Monandrocarpa tritonis Michaelsen, 1904

References

Stolidobranchia
Tunicate genera